The dwarf coqui or elfin coqui (Eleutherodactylus unicolor, in Spanish coquí duende) is a species of frog endemic to Puerto Rico. It is placed in the subgenus Eleutherodactylus.

Description
The dwarf coqui is a small frog with a grayish-brown back, a black-mask like face, and a series of light dots that follow through to the posterior of the frog. The females have a light line across the eyelids and usually have “white dots along the face, flanks, forelimbs, and thighs.” The Eleutherodactylus species do not have webbed feet. These frogs, especially the dwarf coqui, have individual, finger-like feet, with round, disc-like toes. E. coqui is often referred to as the “coqui,” which originates from its distinctive call. The “coqui” frogs are known for the unusual sounds they make. “The call of the dwarf coqui has been compared to the sound of a fingernail being dragged across the teeth of a comb or the winding of a watch.”

See also

Fauna of Puerto Rico
List of endemic fauna of Puerto Rico
List of amphibians and reptiles of Puerto Rico

Sources

Eleutherodactylus
Endemic fauna of Puerto Rico
Amphibians of Puerto Rico
Amphibians described in 1904
Taxonomy articles created by Polbot